Bandar Puteri LRT station is a Light Rapid Transit station situated in Bandar Puteri, Puchong. It is operated under the Sri Petaling Line network and is situated between Puchong Perdana and Taman Perindustrian Puchong station. Like most other LRT stations operating in Klang Valley, this station is elevated. However, unlike most LRT stations on the Sri Petaling Line, this station has an island platform instead of 2 side platforms.

The station is located near Puteri Mart, a market complex with food stalls, wet market and a few shops. A busy shopping area can be reached within a short walking distance from the station. The Bandar Puteri Town Park is also situated nearby. It mainly serves the residences in Bandar Puteri Puchong, along with nearby residential areas such as Puchong Hartamas and Taman Puchong Utama. A transit-oriented development project which consist of SOVO office suites and retail shops is also built near the station.

The station is a part of the Ampang and Sri-Petaling lines LRT Extension Project (LEP) announced in 2006. It was opened on 31 March 2016, along with 3 other stations in Puchong.

History 
The extension of both Sri Petaling Line and Kelana Jaya Line were announced on 29 August 2006 by then Malaysian Deputy Prime Minister Mohd Najib Abdul Razak. This was also confirmed by then Prime Minister of Malaysia Tun Abdullah Badawi in his National Budget speech in 2006.

The extension project, worth RM955.84 million, was awarded to a joint venture (JV) consortium of George Kent (M) Bhd and its partner Lion Pacific Sdn Bhd. Construction started in 2010, while fault free test runs of the trains started on 22 January 2016. Although it faced some delays, the station was opened on 31 March 2016, as a part of the second phase of the extension.

Station

Station layout 
Due to the lack of space, a drop off spot was built instead of a park-and-ride facilities. A convenience store operated by Mynews.com can be found in the station. The entire station is disabled-friendly, with accessibility lifts, accessible toilets, special gate entrance for wheelchair users and tactile paving provided throughout the station. The trains and station platforms are level with one another, with a minimal gap between the two. This allows for easy boarding with a wheelchair.

Infrastructure 
As part of a green initiative, the extension includes green practices. Energy-efficient lights and rainwater harvesting systems were installed in every station. Windows were designed to allow sunlight into the stations. Construction utilized sustainable materials and recycling practices.

Entrances and exits
Bandar Puteri LRT station has a total of two entrances/exits, one heading towards the industrial area (kawasan perindustrian) owned by Tractors Malaysia, another leads to Puteri Mart and the shopping district of Bandar Puteri.

Bus services

Feeder buses

Other buses

Transit-Oriented Development (TOD) 
In 2019, IOI Properties launched Stellar Suites, which is the first transit oriented development in Puchong. The project, which consists of a small office versatile office (Sovo) tower and retail shops, will be built just 50m from the Bandar Puteri LRT station. An affordable housing project near the station was also planned by Perbadanan PR1MA Malaysia (PR1MA), but it was never realised.

Notes

References

External links 
Taman Bandar Puteri LRT Station - KL MRT Line Integrations
Monorail and LRTs - Rapid KL

Ampang Line
Railway stations opened in 2016